This article contains information about the literary events and publications of 1545.

Events
April 2 – Italian scholar Pietro Bembo, on reading Giovanni Battista Ramusio's Description of Africa, a translation from dictation by Leo Africanus, comments: "I cannot imagine how a man could have so much detailed information about these things."

New books

Prose
Roger Ascham – Toxophilus
Girolamo Cardano – Ars Magna
Bernard Etxepare – Linguae Vasconum Primitiae (first book printed in Basque language)
Sir John Fortescue – De laudibus legum Angliae (written c. 1471)
Catherine Parr – Prayers or Meditations (first book published by an English queen under her own name)
Thomas Phaer – The Boke of Chyldren

Poetry
See 1545 in poetry

Births
 May 1 – Franciscus Junius the elder, French theologian (died 02)
 June 6 – Jerome Gratian, Spanish Carmelite writer (died 1614)
unknown date
 George Bannatyne, collector of Scottish poems (died 1608)
 Heinrich Bünting, German theologian and cartographer (died 1606)
Probable year – John Gerard(e), English botanist and author of herbal (died 1612)

Deaths
April 3 – Antonio de Guevara, Spanish chronicler and moralist (born c. 1481)
April 14 – Sir Thomas Clere, English poet
July 7 – Pernette Du Guillet, French poet (born c. 1520)

References

Years of the 16th century in literature